Phoronis is a genus of the horseshoe worm family (Phoronidae), in the phylum Phoronida.
Phoronis may also refer to:
 Various species in the above genus:
Phoronis australis
Phoronis ovalis
Phoronis psammophila
 Phoronis (c. 7th-6th c. BC), an ancient Greek epic poem which told the story of the mythological hero Phoroneus.
 Phoronis (5th c. BC), a lost work by the Greek historian Hellanicus.
 Phoronis, a name for Io, the sister (or descendant) of Phoroneus.